{{Infobox actor awards
|name=Vicky Kaushal 
|image= Vicky Kaushal and other celebs attend the premiere of The Gray Man.jpg
|caption= Kaushal at the premiere of The Gray Man in 2022
|wins=22
|nominations=28
|award1=National Film Awards
|award1W=1|award1N=0|award2=Filmfare Awards|award2W=2|award2N=4|award3=Screen Awards|award3W=1|award3N=5|award4=Zee Cine Awards|award4W=2|award4N=3|award5=Stardust Awards|award5W=0|award5N=1|award6=Star Guild Awards|award6W=0|award6N=1|award7=IIFA Awards|award7W=3|award7N=5|award8=Jagran Film Festival|award8W=1|award8N=0|award9=Indian Film Festival of Melbourne|award9W=1|award9N=1|award10=Others|award10W=11|award10N=8}}Vicky Kaushal' is an Indian actor who appears in Hindi films. He has appeared in Forbes India Celebrity 100 list of 2019. Kaushal is the recipient of 22 accolades into his credit. He won three IIFA Awards one Best Debut Actor for Masaan (2016), Best Supporting Actor for Sanju (2019) and Best Actor for Sardar Udham (2022). He received the Best Actor at the 66th National Film Awards for Uri: The Surgical Strike. Kaushal won the Filmfare Award for Best Supporting Actor for Sanju and Best Actor (Critics) for Sardar Udham''.

Awards and nominations

Other awards and recognitions

Notes

References

External links
Vicky Kaushal awards at IMDb

Lists of awards received by Indian actor